Brigadier W. A. "Bill" Godwin was a Rhodesian army officer.  He served with the Rhodesian African Rifles (RAR) during the British colonial era and was mentioned in despatches for service during the Malayan Emergency.  After Rhodesia's 1965 unilateral declaration of independence from Britain Godwin remained with the RAR, rising to command its 1st battalion.  By 1972 Godwin had reached the rank of brigadier and commanded Rhodesia's 2nd Brigade.  He had retired by 1975 but was brought back to help establish Guard Force, a new armed service that provided security to the protected villages.  The unit disbanded after the 1980 transition to black-majority government (as Zimbabwe).

Rhodesian African Rifles 
Bill Godwin served as an officer in the Rhodesian African Rifles (RAR) during the period when Rhodesia was a British colony.  He was deployed to Malaya during the Emergency and was mentioned in despatches for his service as a temporary major in late 1957.  Godwin later thought his enlisted men, who were black, performed well in Malaya.   He noted "they would see things to which we Europeans were simply not attuned. Most of them were reasonably good trackers and some were brilliant".  He later rose to command the regiment's 1st battalion.

Godwin remained in the white-minority ruled Rhodesia following its 1965 unilateral declaration of independence from Britain.  He participated in the Rhodesian Bush War against guerrillas fighting for black-majority rule.  Godwin reformed the RAR following criticism of its performance, when compared to the recently formed Rhodesian Light Infantry, between Operation Nickel and Operation Cauldron (August 1967-May 1968).  Godwin focussed on improving the leadership abilities of his junior officers and providing training in tracking skills.  Some of these techniques were those he had learnt in Malaya (though the RAR had been criticised during Operation Nickel for its Malaya mindset).  Godwin's twin brother, Major Walter Godwin, had also served during Operation Nickel, in command of 1 Independent Company of the Royal Rhodesia Regiment.

Brigadier 
By 1972 Godwin was a brigadier and in command of the army's 2nd Brigade.  In 1975 he was brought out of retirement to help form Guard Force, an armed service similar to, but separate from, the Rhodesian Army that served to guard the Ministry of Internal Affairs' protected villages.  The Guard Force was initially commanded by  Major General Andrew Rawlins but Godwin assumed command in February 1977 when Rawlins was appointed the army's director of psychological warfare.  The Bush War ended and Rhodesia transitioned to a black majority government in April 1980, as Zimbabwe.  By May the Guard Force was being disbanded.  Godwin presided over the unit's last parade at which he told his men to quietly fade away.

Godwin retired soon afterwards.  He later reflected on the black members of the Rhodesian Army saying "every soldier in the army was a volunteer and it had always been so.  This could hardly be said of those who followed Mugabe and Nkomo ... Throughout this Rhodesia stood alone, and our masodjas [African soldiers] stayed with us to the bitter end".  In retirement Godwin gave lectures in Cape Town to the South African Military History Society.

References 

Rhodesian African Rifles personnel
Possibly living people
Year of birth missing
Rhodesian military personnel of the Bush War
Southern Rhodesian military personnel of the Malayan Emergency